Rashaya, Rachaya, Rashaiya, Rashayya or Rachaiya, also known as Rashaya al-Wadi or Rachaya el-Wadi (and variations), is a town of the Rashaya District in the west of the Jnoub Government of Lebanon.

Rachaya is known for the Rashaya Citadel where Bshara El Khoury was jailed in 1943. It's the symbol of independence.

Culture
Rashaya has a population of around 6,000 to 7,500 that are mostly Druze. It is still considered to be a traditional Lebanese town with its old cobbled streets and small shops, even though it witnessed in recent years a slight expansion of buildings. It retains a distinguished character of traditional stone houses with red tiled roofs.

The small souk in the middle of the town offers various shops selling local crafts and inexpensive goods. There is a recently renovated goldsmiths selling an assortment of gold and silver jewelry in Byzantine and other styles.

The nearby Faqaa forest is classified as a protected area and Pine nuts from the local conifer trees are used in traditional cooking.

The Al-Aryan family was a prominent part of the Druze community in Rashaya in the 19th century and a branch, now called the Aryain family still inhabit the town. Rashaya has four churches and a dozen of Druze khalwaat. There is a Greek Catholic Church and a Syriac Catholic Church along with the Saint Nicholas Greek Orthodox Church.

Archaeology
There have been findings of Paleolithic and Heavy Neolithic Stone Age tools near the town of Qaraoun along with Trihedral Neolithic material recovered nearby at Joub Jannine, both in the Western Bekaa province. The remains of a Roman temple can be seen on the left side of the road leading from Rashaya to the village of Aaiha, one of several Temples of Mount Hermon. There is also a significant Neolithic site nearby at Kawkaba where fragments of agricultural tools such as basalt hoes have been found with very faded dating suggesting the 6th millennium or earlier.

History

The Rashaya Citadel, also known as the Citadel of Independence, has been declared a national monument, having been first built as a palace by the Shihab family in the 18th century. It is now stationed by the Lebanese Armed Forces and can be visited and seen under the army's surveillance.

In June 1860, the town was the scene of a massacre, where two hundred and sixty five Christians were killed by Druze forces, some within the citadel. Around one thousand victims were killed in the areas of Hasbaya and Rashaya between 10 and 13 June.

In November and December 1925, the town was engulfed and nearly obliterated by one of the largest battles of the Great Druze Revolt, when four hundred and twenty nine Christian homes were either damaged or destroyed. Three thousand Druze under Zayd Beg besieged the citadel of French legionnaires under a Captain Granger between 20 and 24 November. The Druze eventually suffered their first major defeat to French reinforcements, with heavy casualties marking a turning point in the Druze invasion of southern Lebanon.

Under the French Mandate and on 11 November 1943, Rashaya witnessed the arrest and the imprisonment of the Lebanese national leaders in its citadel by the Free French troops (Bechara El Khoury (the first post-independence President of Lebanon), Riad El-Solh (the Prime Minister), Pierre Gemayel, Camille Chamoun, Adel Osseiran). This led to a national and international pressure in demand for their release, and eventually obliging France to obey. On November 22, 1943, the prisoners were released, and that day was declared the Lebanese Independence Day.

Geology 
The Rashaya Fault has been defined as a left-lateral strike-slip fault that cuts into Mount Hermon and is an extension of the Banias Fault. It suggested to be pre-Pliocene and may be active. The danger of earthquakes is not high and there have been none on record. It runs a few kilometers east of the Hasbaya Fault, which in turn runs parallel to the Jordan valley. The danger of earthquakes is not high and there have been none recorded from the fault.

Climate
The dominant wind direction is east to west from which the town is somewhat sheltered by the mountains.

Economy
The economy of the town is primarily based on agriculture, the services and tourism industries. The town has two olive oil presses and three grape molasses factories. Rashaya was designated one of nine poverty areas within Lebanon in a survey of 2002. The World Bank and U.S. Aid has financed development projects in the area with the assistance of the YMCA and other NGOs. Projects have included a $500,000 waste water treatment plant and redecoration of the town's guesthouse in 2007.

Agriculture
Commonly grown crops include cherries, olives, apricots and grapes. Some wild cucumbers are also grown, however vegetables are less frequently grown due to low rainfall. Animal husbandry is also practiced, mainly with goats, of which the Labneh variety is a popular staple food for locals. Tree species such as oak, wild pistachio and sumac grow in the area. A variety of jackals and foxes, snakes, lizards and rodents live in the area along with various species of migratory birds.

References

External links
 Lebanon Atlas
 Rashaya on www.discoverlebanon.com
 Panoramic view of Rashaya on www.discoverlebanon.com
 Panoramic view from the Citadel of Independence on www.discoverlebanon.com
 The Dead Sea Transform - An Introduction
 Video of Rashaya on YouTube
 The GEF Small Grants Program - Forest and fruit trees nursery project in Rashayia
 Saint Nicholas Church in Rashaya on Wikimapia

Druze communities in Lebanon
Populated places in Rashaya District
Archaeological sites in Lebanon